The 1950–51 season was Manchester City's 49th season of competitive football and 14th season in the second division of English football. In addition to the Second Division, the club competed in the FA Cup.

First Division

League table

Results summary

References

External links

Manchester City F.C. seasons